The Daily Toreador, also known as The DT, is the student newspaper of Texas Tech University in Lubbock, Texas. The newspaper was first published in 1925 as The Toreador and later changed its name to The University Daily before arriving at the current name in 2005. All content for The DT is produced by a staff around 40 members including editors, reporters and photographers. The DT has received numerous regional and national awards, including two Columbia Scholastic Press Association Silver crown awards and two Associated Collegiate Press Pacemaker Award finalists. As well, the paper counts five Pulitzer Prizes and four winners amongst its former staff members.

History

1925-1966: The Toreador
On October 3, 1925, two days after classes began at Texas Technological College, the first issue of The Toreador was published. The chosen name of the publication was explained in the first issue relevant to the Spanish Renaissance architecture of the campus buildings and unofficial moniker of the football team:

In 1929, The Toreador hosted a contest to create a new school song, with a prize 25 dollar prize offered to the winner. The final result was The Matador Song written by the R.C. Marshall, the editor of the 1931 La Ventana.

During World War II, the newspaper format of The Toreador was reduced in size to tabloid format, and publication was reduced from semi-weekly to weekly.

In 1962, the name of newspaper changed to The Daily Toreador reflecting the increased frequency in publication.

1966-2005: The University Daily
To represent a change in size format from tabloid to broadsheet, the newspaper debuted its new name The University Daily, on September 20, 1966, three years prior to the name change of Texas Technological College to Texas Tech University.

2005-present: The Daily Toreador
To coincide with its 80th anniversary in 2005, the name was reverted to The Daily Toreador. Following the Rawls College of Business move to a new building in 2012, the College of Media & Communication and Student Media relocated to the old Business Administration building.

Circulation
The newspaper prints 10,000 issues on Thursdays during the fall and spring semesters and Tuesdays during summer sessions, and has around 2,000 to 5,000 unique visitors per day to its website, continually making it one of the top-25 read college newspapers in the nation.

Awards
Associated Collegiate Press
 2003–2004 Newspaper Pacemaker Finalist 
 2011 Online Pacemaker Finalist 

Columbia Scholastic Press Association
 2000–2001 Silver Crown Certificate 
 2003–2004 Silver Crown Certificate

Editorial staff
Although two advisers watch over the operations of the newspaper, the day-to-day decisions for the newspaper rest on the student staff. The advisers choose not to restrict the content that is placed in the paper, but instead make suggestions and give advice to the editorial board.

Current

 Sheri Lewis – associate director & media adviser 
 Arianna Flores – editor-in-chief 
 Chyna Vargas  – managing editor 
 Bishop Van Buren – sports editor 
 Arianna Flores – news editor 
 Tana Thompson – features editor 
 Emily Knepp – multimedia editor 
 Chyna Vargas – opinions editor 
 Téa McGilvray – digital content manager 
 Vacant – copy editor 
 Vacant – editorial assistant

Advertising staff

Current 

 Andrea Watson – sales, marketing, & design manager 
 Caroline Shipley – student marketing manager

Professional staff

Current 

 Susan Peterson – director 
 Amie Ward – business manager 
 Kristi Deitiker – administrative assistant

Notable alumni

See also
 Texas Tech University
 List of college newspapers
 La Ventana

References

External links
The Daily Toreador
The Daily Toreador digital collection at TTU

Student newspapers published in Texas
Texas Tech University
Publications established in 1925
Newspapers published in Lubbock, Texas
Daily newspapers published in Texas